Valle La Estrella is a district of the Limón canton, in the Limón province of Costa Rica.

History 
Valle La Estrella was created on 10 August 1992 by Decreto Ejecutivo 21515-G.

Geography 
Valle La Estrella has an area of  km² and an elevation of  metres.

Locations
Barrios: Colonia, Finca Ocho, Guaria, Loras, Pandora Oeste, Río Ley
Poblados: Alsacia, Armenia, Atalanta, Bananito Sur, Boca Cuen, Boca Río Estrella, Bocuare, Bonifacio, Brisas, Buenavista, Burrico, Calveri, Caño Negro, Cartagena, Casa Amarilla, Cerere, Concepción, Cuen, Chirripó Abajo (part), Durfuy (San Miguel), Duruy, Fortuna, Gavilán, Hueco, I Griega, Jabuy, Llano Grande, Manú, Miramar, Moi (San Vicente), Nanabre, Nubes, Penshurt, Pléyades, Porvenir, Progreso, Río Seco, San Andrés, San Carlos, San Clemente, San Rafael, Suruy, Talía, Tobruk, Tuba Creek (part), Valle de las Rosas, Vegas de Cerere, Vesta

Demographics 

For the 2011 census, Valle La Estrella had a population of  inhabitants.

Transportation

Road transportation 
The district is covered by the following road routes:
 National Route 36
 National Route 234

References 

Districts of Limón Province
Populated places in Limón Province